Simon Mark Featherstone  (24 July 1958 – 26 August 2014) was a British diplomat whose posts included High Commissioner to Malaysia.

Career
Simon Featherstone was educated at Whitgift School and Lincoln College, Oxford. He joined the Foreign and Commonwealth Office in 1980 and after language training at SOAS and in Hong Kong served in Beijing, Brussels and Shanghai. He was British ambassador to Switzerland and non-resident ambassador to Liechtenstein 2004–08, the Prime Minister's International Representative on Energy Issues in 2008, UK director for the 2010 Shanghai Expo (where the UK pavilion won the award for best pavilion design) and was British High Commissioner to Malaysia from October 2010 until ill health forced him to retire in May 2014. While in Malaysia, he was also one of the patrons of the British Theatre Playhouse, a theatrical and musical production company which works with British entertainment shows.

Featherstone was appointed Companion of the Order of St Michael and St George (CMG) in the New Year Honours of 2011.

References

FEATHERSTONE, Simon Mark, Who's Who 2014, online edn, Oxford University Press, Dec 2013.
Simon Featherstone, Esq, CMG Authorised Biography, Debrett's People of Today.

 

1958 births
2014 deaths
People educated at Whitgift School
Alumni of Lincoln College, Oxford
Ambassadors of the United Kingdom to Switzerland
Ambassadors of the United Kingdom to Liechtenstein
High Commissioners of the United Kingdom to Malaysia
Companions of the Order of St Michael and St George
20th-century British diplomats
21st-century British diplomats
Consuls-General of the United Kingdom in Shanghai